Tanaecia is a genus of butterflies of the family Nymphalidae.

Species
The genus includes the following species:

Tanaecia amisa Grose-Smith, 1889
Tanaecia ampla Butler, 1901
Tanaecia aruna (C. & R. Felder, 1860)
Tanaecia borromeoi Schröder, 1977
Tanaecia calliphorus (C. & R. Felder, 1861)
Tanaecia cibaritis (Hewitson, 1874)
Tanaecia clathrata (Vollenhoven, 1862)
Tanaecia cocytus (Fabricius, 1787) - lavender count
Tanaecia coelebs Corbet, 1941
Tanaecia dodong Schröder & Treadaway, 1978
Tanaecia elone de Nicéville, 1893
Tanaecia flora Butler, 1873
Tanaecia godartii (Gray, 1846)
Tanaecia howarthii Jumalon, 1975
Tanaecia iapis (Godard, 1824)
Tanaecia jahnu (Moore, 1857) - plain earl
Tanaecia julii (Lesson, 1837) - common earl
Tanaecia lepidea (Butler, 1868) - grey count
Tanaecia leucotaenia Semper, 1878
Tanaecia lutala (Moore, 1859)
Tanaecia munda Fruhstorfer, 1899
Tanaecia orphne  Butler, 1870
Tanaecia palawana Staudinger, 1889
Tanaecia palguna (Moore, 1858)
Tanaecia pelea (Fabricius, 1787)
Tanaecia susoni Jumalon, 1975
Tanaecia trigerta (Moore, 1857)
Tanaecia valmikis C. & R. Felder, 1867
Tanaecia vikrama C. & R. Felder, 1867

References

 
Nymphalidae genera
Taxa named by Arthur Gardiner Butler
Limenitidinae